The Talysh language (تؤلشه زوؤن, Tolışə Zıvon, Tолышә зывон), is a Northwestern Iranian language spoken in the northern regions of the Iranian provinces of Gilan and Ardabil and the southern regions of the Republic of Azerbaijan by around 500,000-800,000 people. Talysh language is closely related to the Tati language. It includes many dialects usually divided into three main clusters: Northern (in Azerbaijan and Iran), Central (Iran) and Southern (Iran). Talysh is partially, but not fully, intelligible with Persian. Talysh is classified as "vulnerable" by UNESCO's Atlas of the World's Languages in Danger.

History 

The origin of the name Talysh is not clear but is likely to be quite old. The name of the people appears in early Arabic sources as Al-Taylasân and in Persian as Tâlišân and Tavâliš, which are plural forms of Tâliš. Northern Talysh (in the Republic of Azerbaijan) was historically known as Tâlish-i Guštâsbi. Talysh has always been mentioned with Gilan or Muqan. Writing in the 1330s AP, Hamdallah Mostowfi calls the language of Gushtaspi (covering the Caspian border region between Gilan to Shirvan) a Pahlavi language connected to the language of Gilan. Although there are no confirmed records, the language called in Iranian linguistics as Azari can be the antecedent of both Talysh and Tati. Miller's (1953) hypothesis that the Âzari of Ardabil, as appears in the quatrains of Shaikh Safi, was a form of Talysh was confirmed by Henning (1954). In western literature the people and the language are sometimes referred to as Talishi, Taleshi or Tolashi. Generally speaking, written documents about Taleshi are rare.

The first information about the Talysh language in Russian can be found in Volume X of Strachevsky's "Encyclopedic Dictionary" ("Справочный энциклопедический словарь"), published in St. Petersburg in 1848.  The work says:

"The Talysh dialect is one of the six main dialects of Persian. It is used in the Talysh khanate and is probably the homeland of that language. Due to its grammatical and lexicographic forms, this language is noticeably different from other dialects.  Except for the addition of the plural suffix "un", it is peculiar and is not derived from any Pahlavi or any other language. This language puts all relative pronouns before the noun, and the pronouns themselves are original in it.

The second information about the Talysh language is provided by Ilya Berezin, a professor at Kazan University, in Russian, but not in Russian, but in French.  In 1853, Berezin's book on Persian grammar was published in Kazan.  In the same year, his book "Recherches sur les dialectes persans" was published in Kazan.  Experts still refer to this work as the first work of Russian Iranians in the field of Iranian dialectology.  He used the "Talysh" songs given in A. Khodzko's work.  IN Berezin's work consists of two parts - a grammatical essay and songs from A. Khodzko's work.  IN Berezin writes that he conducted his research on Iranian dialects on the basis of materials he personally collected and studied, but does not write anywhere with whom, when and in what area he collected them.  In the work, Talysh words are distorted.  IN Berezin writes about the quartets taken from the work of A. Khodzko:

"Here I present to the reader a new translation of the Talysh, Gilan and Mazandaran songs and accompany them with critical notes; the Talysh texts, if not in Khodzko, were restored by me on the basis of his transcription."  However, the author writes that "grammatical rules are not strictly observed in the Talysh language, as the verb's news form is usually confused almost all the time, ie instead of the aorist preterit, the future  time in the present tense, etc.  is used. "  Going even further, he writes: "In the Talysh language, the verb is the most difficult, the most confusing and the most dubious part."

Geography 

In the north of Iran, there are six cities where Talysh is spoken: Masal, Rezvanshar, Talesh, Fuman, Shaft, and Masuleh (in these cities some people speak Gilaki and Turkish as well). The only towns where Talysh is spoken exclusively are the townships of Masal and Masuleh. In other cities, in addition to Talysh, people speak Gilaki and Azerbaijani. In Azerbaijan there are eight cities where Talysh is spoken: Astara (98%), Lerik  (90%), Lenkoran  (90%), Masalli (36%). 

Talysh has been under the influence of Gilaki, Azeri Turkic, and Persian. In the south (Taleshdula, Masal, Shanderman, and Fumanat) the Talysh and Gilaks live side by side; however, there is less evidence that a Talysh family replaces Gilaki with its own language. In this region, the relation is more of a contribution to each other's language. In the north of Gilan, on the other hand, Azeri Turkic has replaced Talysh in cities like Astara after the migration of Turkic speakers to the region decades ago. However, the people around Lavandvil and its mountainous regions have retained Talysh. Behzad Behzadi, the author of "Azerbaijani Persian Dictionary" remarks that: "The inhabitants of Astara are Talyshis and in fifty years ago (about 1953) that I remember the elders of our family spoke in that language and the great majority of dwellers also conversed in Talyshi. In the surrounding villages, a few were familiar with Turkic". From around Lisar up to Hashtpar, Azeri and Talysh live side by side, with the latter mostly spoken in small villages. To the south of Asalem, the influence of Azeri is negligible and the tendency is towards Persian along with Talysh in cities. In the Azerbaijan republic, Talysh is less under the influence of Azeri and Russian than Talysh in Iran is affected by Persian. Central Talysh has been considered the purest of all Talysh dialects.

Classification and related languages 

Talysh belongs to the Northwestern Iranian branch of Indo-European languages. The living language most closely related to Talysh is Tati. The Tati group of dialects is spoken across the Talysh range in the southwest (Kajal and Shahrud) and south (Tarom). This Tatic family should not be confused with another Tat family which is more related to Persian. Talysh also shares many features and structures with Zazaki, now spoken in Turkey, and the Caspian languages and Semnani of Iran.

Dialects 

The division of Talysh into three clusters is based on lexical, phonological and grammatical factors. Northern Talysh distinguishes itself from Central and Southern Talysh not only geographically but culturally and linguistically as well. Speakers of Northern Talysh are found almost exclusively in the Republic of Azerbaijan but can also be found in the neighbouring regions of Iran, in the Province of Gilan. The varieties of Talysh spoken in the Republic of Azerbaijan are best described as speech varieties rather than dialects. Four speech varieties are generally identified on the basis of phonetic and lexical differences. These are labeled according to the four major political districts in the Talysh region: Astara, Lankaran, Lerik, and Masalli. The differences between the varieties are minimal at the phonetic  and lexical level. Mamedov (1971) suggests a more useful dialectal distinction is one between the varieties spoken in the mountains and those spoken in the plains. The morphosyntax of Northern Talysh is characterized by a complicated split system which is based on the Northwest Iranian type of accusativity/ergativity dichotomy: it shows accusative features with present-stem-based transitive constructions, whereas past-stem-based constructions tend towards an ergative behavior. In distant regions like Lavandevil and Masuleh, the dialects differ to such a degree that conversations begin to be difficult. In Iran, the northern dialect is in danger of extinction.

Some Northern dialects' differences 

The northern dialect has some salient differences from the central and southern dialects, e.g.:

Alignment variation

The durative marker "ba" in Taleshdulaei changes to "da" in Lankarani and shifts in between the stem and person suffixes:
 ba-žē-mun → žē-da-mun

Such a diversification exists in each dialect too, as in the case of Masali

Phonology  
The following is the Northern Talysh dialect:

Consonants

Vowels 

 Vowel sounds followed by a nasal consonant, /_nC/, often tend to be nasalized.

Scripts 
The vowel system in Talysh is more extended than in standard Persian. The prominent differences are the front vowel ü in central and northern dialects and the central vowel ə. In 1929, a Latin-based alphabet was created for Talysh in the Soviet Union. However, in 1938 it was changed to Cyrillic-based, but it did not gain extensive usage for a variety of reasons, including political Stalinist consolidation of socialist nations. An orthography based on Azeri Latin is used in Azerbaijan, and also in Iranian sources, for example on the IRIB's ParsToday website. The Perso-Arabic script is also used in Iran, although publications in the language are rare and are mostly volumes of poetry. The following tables contain the vowels and consonants used in Talysh. The sounds of the letters on every row, pronounced in each language, may not correspond fully.

Monophthongs

Diphthongs

Consonants

Differences from Persian 

The general phonological differences of some Talysh dialects with respect to standard Persian are as follows:

Grammar 

Talysh has a subject–object–verb word order. In some situations the case marker, 'i' or 'e' attaches to the accusative noun phrase. There is no definite article, and the indefinite one is "i". The plural is marked by the suffixes "un", "ēn" and also "yēn" for nouns ending with vowels. In contrast to Persian, modifiers are preceded by nouns, for example: "maryami kitav" (Mary's book) and "kava daryâ" (livid sea). Like most other Iranian dialects there are two categories of inflexion, subject and object cases. The "present stem" is used for the imperfect and the "past stem" for the present in the verbal system. That differentiates Talysh from most other Western Iranian dialects. In the present tense, verbal affixes cause a rearranging of the elements of conjugation in some dialects like Tâlešdulâbi, e.g. for expressing the negation of b-a-dašt-im (I sew), "ni" is used in the following form: ni-m-a-dašt (I don't sew)."m" is first person singular marker, "a" denotes duration and "dašt" is the past stem.

Pronouns 

Talysh is a null-subject language, so nominal pronouns (e.g. I, he, she) are optional. For first person singular, both "az" and "men" are used. Person suffixes are not added to stems for "men". 
Examples:
men xanda. (I read.), az bexun-em (Should I read ...)
men daxun! (Call me!), az-daxun-em (Should I call ...)

There are three prefixes in Talysh and Tati added to normal forms making possessive pronouns. They are: "če / ča" and "eš / še".

Verbs 

 preverbs: â/o, da, vi/i/ē/â, pē/pi
 Negative Markers: ne, nē, ni
 Subjunctive/Imperative prefix: be
 Durative markers: a, ba, da

The following Person Suffixes are used in different dialects and for different verbs.

Conjugations 

The past stem is inflected by removing the infinitive marker (ē), however the present stem and jussive mood are not so simple in many cases and are irregular. For some verbs, present and past stems are identical. The "be" imperative marker  is not added situationally. The following tables show the conjugations for first-person singular of "sew" in some dialects of the three dialectical categories:

Stems and imperative mood

Active voice

Passive voice

Nouns and adpositions 

There are four "cases" in Talysh, the nominative (unmarked), the genitive, the (definite) accusative and ergative.

The nominative case (characterized by null morpheme on nouns) encodes the subject; the predicate; the indefinite direct object in a nominative clause; definite direct object in an ergative clause;  the vowel-final main noun in a noun phrase with another noun modifying it; and, finally, the nominal element in an adpositional phrases with certain adpositions. The examples below are from Pirejko 1976    
PRST:present stem
REFL:reflexive pronoun

The ergative case, on the other hand, has the following functions: indicating the subject of an ergative phrase; definite direct object (in this function, ergative case takes the form of -ni after vowel-final stems); nominal modifier in a noun phrase; the nominal element in adpositional phrases with most adpositions.

The accusative form is often used to express the simple indirect object in addition to the direct object. These "cases" are in origin actually just particles, similar to Persian prepositions like "râ".

Vocabulary

References

Further reading 
Abdoli, A., 1380 AP / 2001 AD. Tat and Talysh literature (Iran and Azerbaijan republic). Entešâr Publication, Tehran, . 
Asatrian, G., and Habib Borjian, 2005. Talish: people and language: The state of research. Iran and the Caucasus 9/1, pp. 43–72 (published by Brill).
Bazin, M., 1974. Le Tâlech et les tâlechi: Ethnic et region dans le nord-ouest de l’Iran, Bulletin de l’Association de Geographes Français, no. 417–418, 161–170. 
Bazin, M., 1979. Recherche des papports entre diversité dialectale et geographie humaine: l’example du Tâleš, G. Schweizer, (ed.), Interdisciplinäre Iran-Forschung: Beiträge aus Kulturgeographie, Ethnologie, Soziologie und Neuerer Geschichte, Wiesbaden, 1–15. 
Bazin, M., 1981. Quelque échantillons des variations dialectales du tâleši, Studia Iranica 10, 111–124, 269–277. 
Paul, D., 2011. A comparative dialectal description of Iranian Taleshi. PhD Dissertation: University of Manchester. https://www.escholar.manchester.ac.uk/uk-ac-man-scw:119653
Yarshater, E., 1996. The Taleshi of Asalem. Studia Iranica, 25, New York.
Yarshater, E., "Tâlish". Encyclopaedia of Islam, 2nd ed., vol. 10.

External links 

 Positive Orientation Towards the Vernacular among the Talysh of Sumgayit
 Example of Talyshi Language
 B. Miller. Talysh language and the languages of Azeri 
 A. Mamedov, k.f.n. Talishes as carriers of the ancient language of Azerbaijan 
 A short note on the history of Talyshi literature 

Talysh
Northwestern Iranian languages
Languages of Iran
Languages of Azerbaijan
Caspian languages